Clarence Eldon "Rags" Raglan (September 4, 1927 – April 15, 2002) was a Canadian professional ice hockey defenceman who played 100 games in the National Hockey League with the Detroit Red Wings and Chicago Black Hawks between 1950 and 1953. The rest of his career, which lasted from 1944 to 1961, was spent in various minor leagues. Raglan was born in Pembroke, Ontario, and his son, Herb Raglan, also played in the NHL.

Career statistics

Regular season and playoffs

External links
 
 

1927 births
2002 deaths
Buffalo Bisons (AHL) players
Canadian ice hockey defencemen
Chicago Blackhawks players
Detroit Red Wings players
Edmonton Flyers (WHL) players
Ice hockey people from Ontario
Indianapolis Capitals players
Ontario Hockey Association Senior A League (1890–1979) players
St. Louis Flyers players
Sportspeople from Pembroke, Ontario
Toronto Marlboros players
Vancouver Canucks (WHL) players
Washington Presidents players
Windsor Bulldogs (OHA) players